Turati's boubou (Laniarius turatii) is a species of bird in the family Malaconotidae.
It is found in Guinea, Guinea-Bissau, and Sierra Leone.
Its natural habitat is moist savanna.

The common name and Latin binomial commemorates the Milanese banker Ercole Turati  (1829-1881) who also collected natural history specimens.

References

Turati's boubou
Birds of West Africa
Turati's boubou
Taxonomy articles created by Polbot